The 1973–74 Idaho State Bengals men's basketball team represented Idaho State University during the 1973–74 NCAA Division I men's basketball season.

The Bengals were led by third-year head coach Jim Killingsworth and played their home games on campus at the ISU Minidome in Pocatello.

With two years until the conference tournament was introduced, the Big Sky title was decided with an unscheduled one-game playoff at Missoula on Tuesday night. Before a record crowd at Dahlberg Arena, the visiting Bengals won 60–57 and advanced to the 25-team NCAA tournament, their first appearance in 

ISU hosted the first round (subregional) of the West regional, and met #17 New Mexico  in the nightcap on Saturday night.  Lobos, WAC champions, won by eight to end the Bengals' season 

Senior forward Jim Anderson was named to the all-conference team; senior center Dan Spindler and junior guard Kevin Hoyt were honorable mention.

Idaho State returned to the NCAA tournament three years later and advanced to the Elite Eight, which remains the best-ever showing for a Big Sky team.

Postseason results

|-
!colspan=9 style=| Big Sky Playoff

|-
!colspan=9 style=| NCAA tournament

References

External links
Sports Reference – Idaho State Bengals – 1973–74 basketball season

Idaho State Bengals men's basketball seasons
Idaho State
Idaho State
Idaho State